Yoon Hee-seok (born February 19, 1975) is a South Korean actor.

Filmography

Film

Television series

Music video

Theater

Awards and nominations

References

External links
 
 
 
 Yoon Hee-seok Fan Cafe at Daum
 
 
 

1975 births
Living people
People from Buyeo County
South Korean male television actors
South Korean male film actors
South Korean male stage actors
South Korean male musical theatre actors
South Korean male web series actors
Korea National University of Arts alumni
Hanyang University alumni